Lotta Nevalainen (born 6 September 1994) is a Finnish swimmer. She competed in the women's 100 metre freestyle event at the 2017 World Aquatics Championships.

References

External links
 

1994 births
Living people
Place of birth missing (living people)
Swimmers at the 2010 Summer Youth Olympics
Finnish female freestyle swimmers